The discography of American reggae rock band Dirty Heads consists of eight studio albums and twenty-two singles.

Albums

Studio albums

Singles

Notes

References 

Dirty Heads albums
Discographies of American artists